The triathlon competitions at the 1995 Pan American Games in Mar del Plata, Argentina, were scheduled on March 26. Triathlon is a sport that combines three different modalities, in which competitors compete for the best overall time. In total, 57 triathletes participated in the two events in the sport.

In the women's event, the American Karen Smyers won the gold medal. The podium was completed by Canadians Kristie Otto and Fiona Cribb, silver and bronze medalists, respectively. In the men's event, Brazil won the competition with Leandro Macedo. He was followed by Canadian Mark Bates and Argentine Oscar Galíndez.

Events
Triathlon was included in the Pan American calendar in 1993. Two years later, the events were scheduled for March 26 in Mar del Plata. The Brazilian Susana Schnarndorf led the swimming race, followed by the American Gail Laurence. This remained in the first places, but ended up off the podium. In cycling, Canadian Kristie Otto had the best performance, followed by Karen Smyers and Gail. Smyers, however, overtook Otto in the last race, winning the gold. Fiona Cribb also won a position in the last race, completing the podium with the bronze medal. In the transition from swimming for men, the American Nataniel Llerandi took the lead with 17 minutes and 25 seconds, but lost positions during the race. Argentine Oscar Galíndez finished cycling in first position, he remained on the podium after finishing in third position, but was overtaken by Brazilian Leandro Macedo and Canadian Mark Bates.

Medalists
American triathlete Karen Smyers won the gold medal in the women's event, while Canadian Kristie Otto and Fiona Cribb won silver and bronze medals, respectively. The male event ended with the victory of Brazilian Leandro Macedo; the podium was completed by triathletes Mark Bates (silver medalist) and Oscar Galíndez (bronze medalist).

Medal board
In this edition, Brazil and the United States shared the leadership of the medal table, winning the men's and women's competition, respectively. However, Canada was the country with the most medals won; the country kept the two silvers distributed and also obtained a bronze. Finally, Argentina finished with the men's bronze medal.

References

Events at the 1995 Pan American Games
P
1995